Bregeon is a French surname which may refer to:

 Bernadette Brégeon (born 1964), French sprint canoer 
 Bernard Brégeon (born 1962), French sprint canoer 
 Dylan Bregeon (born 1994), French boxer
 Maud Bregeon (born 1991), French politician

See also 

 Brehon

Surnames
French-language surnames
Surnames of French origin